Ernst F. Laeisz was a sailor from Germany, who represented his country at the 1928 Summer Olympics in Amsterdam, Netherlands.

Sources 
 

Sailors at the 1928 Summer Olympics – 6 Metre
Olympic sailors of Germany
1888 births
1958 deaths
German male sailors (sport)
Place of birth missing
Norddeutscher Regatta Verein sailors